Symphysa lepidaria is a moth in the family Crambidae. It was described by Stoll in 1781. It is found in Suriname, Costa Rica and Mexico.

References

Evergestinae
Moths described in 1781